Shāh Mahmūd Hotak,, also known as Shāh Mahmūd Ghiljī (lived 1697 – April 22, 1725), was an Afghan ruler of the Hotak dynasty who overthrew the heavily declined Safavid dynasty to briefly become the king of Persia from 1722 until his death in 1725.

He was the eldest son of Mirwais Hotak, the chief of the Ghilji Pashtun tribe of Afghanistan  ,who had made the Kandahar region independent from Persian rule in 1709. When Mirwais died in 1715, he was succeeded by his brother, Abdul Aziz, but the Ghilji Pashtuns persuaded Mahmud to seize power for himself and in 1717 he overthrew and killed his uncle.

Mahmud takes the throne of Iran

In 1720, Mahmud and the Ghiljis defeated the rival ethnic Pashtun tribe of the Abdalis (now called the Durranis). However, Mahmud had designs on the Persian empire itself. He had already launched an expedition against Kerman in 1719 and in 1721 he besieged the city again. Failing in this attempt and in another siege on Yazd, in early 1722, Mahmud turned his attention to the Shah's capital, Isfahan, after first defeating the Persians at the Battle of Gulnabad. Rather than biding his time within the city and resisting a siege in which the small Pashtun army was unlikely to succeed, Soltan Hoseyn marched out to meet Mahmud's forces at Gulnabad. Here, on March 8, the Persian royal army was thoroughly routed and fled back to Isfahan in disarray. The Shah was urged to escape to the provinces to raise more troops, but he decided to remain in the capital, which was now encircled by the Pashtuns. Mahmud's Siege of Isfahan lasted from March to October, 1722. Lacking artillery, he was forced to resort to a long blockade in the hope of starving the Persians into submission. Soltan Hoseyn's command during the siege displayed his customary lack of decisiveness and the loyalty of his provincial governors wavered in the face of such incompetence. Starvation and disease finally forced Isfahan into submission (it is estimated that 80,000 of its inhabitants died during the siege). On October 23, Soltan Hoseyn abdicated and acknowledged Mahmud as the new Shah of Persia.

Mahmud's reign as shah
In the very early days of his rule, Mahmud displayed benevolence, treating the captured royal family well and bringing in food supplies to the starving capital. But he was confronted with a rival claimant to the throne when Hosein's son, Tahmasp declared himself shah in November. Mahmud sent an army against Tahmasp's base, Qazvin. Tahmasp escaped and the Pashtuns took the city but, shocked at the treatment they received at the hands of the conquering army, the population rose up against them in January 1723. The revolt was a success and Mahmud was worried about the reaction when the surviving Pashtuns returned to Isfahan to bring news of the defeat. Suffering from mental illnesses and fearing a revolt by his subjects, Mahmud invited his Persian ministers and nobles to a meeting under false pretences and had them slaughtered. He also executed up to 3,000 of the Persian royal guards. At the same time the Persian arch rivals, the Ottomans, and the Russians took advantage of the chaos in Persia to seize land for themselves, limiting the amount of territory under Mahmud's control.

His failure to impose his rule across Persia made Mahmud depressed and suspicious. He was also concerned about the loyalty of his own men, since many Pashtun tribes preferred his cousin Ashraf Khan. In February 1725, believing a rumour that one of Soltan Hoseyn's sons, Safi Mirza, had escaped, Mahmud ordered the execution of all the other Safavid princes who were in his hands, with the exception of Soltan Hoseyn himself. When Soltan Hoseyn tried to stop the massacre, he was wounded, but his action led to Mahmud sparing the lives of two of his young children.

Death
Mahmud began to succumb to insanity as well as physical deterioration. On April 22, 1725, a group of Afghan officers freed Ashraf Khan from the prison where he had been confined by Mahmud and launched a palace revolution which placed Ashraf on the throne. Mahmud died three days later, either from his illness – as it was claimed at the time – or murder by suffocation.

References

Sources
 Michael Axworthy, The Sword of Persia: Nader Shah, from Tribal Warrior to Conquering Tyrant Hardcover 348 pages (26 July 2006) Publisher: I.B. Tauris Language: English

External links 
 
An outline of the History of Persia during the last two centuries (1722–1922), The Afghan Invasion (1722–1730)

1697 births
1725 deaths
18th-century Afghan monarchs
18th-century monarchs of Persia
Pashtun people
People from Kandahar
Year of birth uncertain
Hotak dynasty